BLFC may refer to:
 Badak Lampung F.C., Indonesia
 Badshot Lea F.C., England
 Biggest Little Fur Con, a furry convention in Reno, Nevada
 Black Leopards F.C., South Africa
 Bulwer-Lytton Fiction Contest